Rancho Cienega del Gabilán  was a  Mexican land grant in present-day Monterey County and San Benito County, California.

It was granted in 1843  by Governor Manuel Micheltorena  to Antonio Chaves (Chávez).  The name means "spring of the hawk ranch".  The grant was located in the Gabilan Range east of  present-day Salinas.

History
José Antonio Chávez came to California in 1833 with Governor José Figueroa.  He was a tax collector at Monterey in 1843, and one of the prime movers in the movement against Manuel Micheltorena 1844.  Chávez was the grantee of the eleven square league Rancho Cienega del Gabilán 1843 and the three square league Rancho Pleyto in 1845.  He took part as Lieutenant in various military operations in the Mexican–American War of 1846.  He was sent by José Castro to John C. Frémont's camp at Gavilan Peak.  Later he kidnapped Thomas O. Larkin and was second in command at the Battle of Natividad, where he was wounded.  He returned to Mexico in 1848. 
 
With the cession of California to the United States following the Mexican-American War, the 1848 Treaty of Guadalupe Hidalgo provided that the land grants would be honored.  As required by the Land Act of 1851, a claim for Rancho Cienega del Gabilán was filed by José Yves Limantour with the Public Land Commission in 1853.  José Yves Limantour, who became notorious for his fraudulent claims, maintained that he had bought the grant from Chaves.  The land commission rejected his claim.

Thomas O. Larkin (1802 - 1858) claimed he bought Rancho Cienega del Gabilan from Chaves and received confirmation of it just after he died in 1858. Larkin had also bought Rancho Pleyto from Chaves.

Jesse D. Carr bought the rancho from the Larkin heirs, and the grant was patented to Jesse D. Carr in 1867.

See also
List of Ranchos of California

References

Cienega del Gabilan
Cienega del Gabilan
Cienega del Gabilan
Gabilan Range
Cienega del Gabilan